Events from the year 1970 in Jordan.

Incumbents
Monarch: Hussein 
Prime Minister: 
 until 27 June: Bahjat Talhouni
 27 June-16 September: Abdelmunim al-Rifai
 16 September-26 September: Mohammad Daoud Al-Abbasi 
 26 September-28 October: Ahmad Toukan 
 starting 28 October: Wasfi al-Tal

Events

 Black September in Jordan - Civil war.
 Dawson's Field hijackings.

See also

 Years in Iraq
 Years in Syria
 Years in Saudi Arabia

References

 
Jordan
Jordan
Years of the 20th century in Jordan